Chrysina hawksi is a species of ruteline scarab beetle from Central America, known from Guatemala (Baja Verapaz, Huehuetenango, and Zacapa) and Mexico (Chiapas).

References 

Rutelinae
Beetles described in 2010